The United States Virgin Islands competed at the 2011 Pan American Games held in Guadalajara, Mexico from October 14 to 30, 2011. The Virgin Islands sent sixteen athletes in seven sports to compete. Hans Lawaetz the president of the Virgin Islands Olympic Committee carried the flag during the opening ceremony.

Athletics

The Virgin Islands qualified seven athletes (four male and three female).

Men
Track and road events

Field events

Women
Track and road events

Boxing

The Virgin Islands have qualified two boxers.

Men

Women

Sailing

Virgin Islands qualified 2 boats and 2 athletes.

Men

Women

Shooting

The Virgin Islands qualified two shooters.

Men

Women

Swimming

The Virgin Islands qualified one swimmer.

Men

Taekwondo

The Virgin Islands received a wildcard to send one male taekwondo athlete.

Men

Triathlon

The Virgin Islands qualified one triathlete.

Men

References

Nations at the 2011 Pan American Games
P
2011